Sergei Alekseyevich Zverev (October 18, 1912 — December 17, 1978) was a Soviet politician who served as the Defence Industry Minister from 1965 to 1978).

Biography
Sergei Zverev started to work in 1930. In 1936 he graduated from LITMO.

From 1936 he took position of Engineer and started to take part in public activity. In 1939 he was elected Leading Political Consultant. From 1944 till 1947 he occupied positions of Leading Engineer and Assistant Director in Krasnogorsky Zavod.

From 1947 till 1958 he had occupied leading positions in USSR Military Industry Ministry and in USSR Defence Industry Ministry.

From 1958 till 1963 he occupied positions of co-chairman and USSR State Committee of Council of Defence Industry (GKOT) Ministers Primal Assistant Chairman. From 1963 till 1965 was a chairman of USSR State Defence Industry Committee, and became a Defence Industry Minister in 1965.

A member of Communist Party of the Soviet Union. A member of the Central Committee of the Communist Party of the Soviet Union in 1966-1978. Supreme Soviet of the Soviet Union delegate. Buried in Novodevichy Cemetery, Moscow.

Memory
The Krasnogorsky Zavod and Leningrad Military Technical School was named in honour of Sergei Zverev. In 2007 street in Krasnogorsk was given the name of Sergei Zverev.

Russian Optical Society established a medal in the honour of Sergei Zverev.

Awards
Sergei Zverev was awarded Hero of Socialist Labour (1972); Order of Lenin (awarded six time); Order of the Red Banner of Labour (awarded two times); Order of the Patriotic War, 1st class; Order of the Red Star; Order of the Badge of Honour.

He was also awarded Lenin Prize in 1976 and USSR State Prize in 1971.

References

1912 births
1978 deaths
People from Novgorod Governorate
Central Committee of the Communist Party of the Soviet Union members
ITMO University alumni
Seventh convocation members of the Supreme Soviet of the Soviet Union
Eighth convocation members of the Supreme Soviet of the Soviet Union
Ninth convocation members of the Supreme Soviet of the Soviet Union
Heroes of Socialist Labour
Lenin Prize winners
Recipients of the Order of Lenin
Recipients of the Order of the Red Banner of Labour
Recipients of the Order of the Red Star
Recipients of the USSR State Prize
Russian mechanical engineers
Soviet mechanical engineers
Burials at Novodevichy Cemetery